Stevan L. Davies (born 1948) is an author and Emeritus Professor of Religious Studies at Misericordia University in Dallas, Pennsylvania.  His most notable work has been in the analysis of Christian apocrypha, especially the Gospel of Thomas. He is married to Sally Watkins Davies and has two children, Michael L. Davies and Meredith G. Russell. 

Davies holds a bachelor's degree from Duke University and a doctorate in philosophy from Temple University.

He was Professor of Religious Studies at Misericordia University from 1979 to 2015.

Published works

Books
Spirit Possession and the Origins of Christianity, Bardic Press, 2014
The New Testament: An Analytical Approach, Polebridge Press, 2011
The Infancy Gospels of Jesus Annotated & Explained: Apocryphal Tales from the Childhoods of Mary and Jesus, Skylight-Paths Press, 2009
The Secret Book of John  Annotated and Explained: The Gnostic Gospel, Skylight-Paths Press, 2005
The Gospel of Thomas  Annotated and Explained,  Skylight-Paths Press, 2002  (Hardback edition: Shambala Press, 2004)
Jesus the Healer: Possession, Trance, and the Origins of Christianity, Continuum Press, 1995
The Gospel of Thomas and Christian Wisdom, Seabury/Harper and Row, 1983
The Revolt of the Widows: The Social World of the Apocryphal Acts, Southern Illinois University Press, 1980

Book chapters
 “But I Say Unto You: ‘Who Is Elias?’” in: New Directions in Mormon Studies  edited by Eric Mason and Quincy Newell, University of Illinois Press, 2013
  “The Gospel of Thomas,” in The Oxford Encyclopedia of the Books of the Bible, Oxford University Press, 2011.
  “The Gospel of Thomas,” in Eerdman's Dictionary of the Bible, edited by David Noel Freedman, Eerdmans, 2000
  “Women in the Third Gospel and the New Testament Apocrypha,” in Women Like This: New Perspectives on Jewish Women in the Greco-Roman World, edited by Amy-Jill Levine, Scholars Press, 1991

Articles
 "The Popul Vuh’s Myth of the Origin of Shamans," Community College Humanities Review, Volume 28, Fall 2008
 “Mark’s Use of the Gospel of Thomas," Neotestamentica, Vol. 30 No. 2 1996
 “The Christology and Protology of the Gospel of Thomas,” Journal of Biblical Literature, Vol. III No. 4, 1992
 '“Women, Tertullian and the Acts of Paul,” Semeia, 1986
 “John the Baptist and Essene Kashruth,” New Testament Studies, Vol. 29 No 4, 1983
 “The Lion Headed Yaldabaoth,” Journal of Religious History, Vol 11, No 4, 1981
 “Who is Called Barabbas?” New Testament Studies, Vol 27 No 1,1981
 “The Predicament of Ignatius of Antioch,” Vigiliae Christianae, Vol 30, 1976

Television appearances
 History Channel: contributor on Gnosticism – “The Real Face of Jesus”,  2010
 British Broadcasting Corporation: (Discovery Channel in USA);  Miracles of Jesus Series:   “Jesus’ Miracles of Healing” 2005
 National Geographic Channel - Science of the Bible Series: “Jesus as Healer” 2005
 British Broadcasting Corporation: (Discovery Channel in USA) - Ancient Evidence Series:   “The Real Disciples of Jesus.” 2004
 British Broadcasting Corporation: (Discovery Channel in USA) - Ancient Evidence Series:   “The Real Mary Magdalene.” 2004
 Arts and Entertainment Network production, on-camera contributor regarding the New Testament for the Biography Series program:   “The Biography of Satan” 1998

References

External links
The Gospel of Thomas Homepage
A Picture Tour of the Old City of Jerusalem
Photographs and Commentary on Mayan Copan, Honduras
The Miniature Paintings of Mongolian Buddhism:Tsaklis, Thangkas and Burhany Zurags

American religious writers
Duke University alumni
Temple University alumni
1948 births
Living people